A low-cost carrier terminal or LCCT (also known as a budget terminal) is a specific type of airport terminal designed with the needs of low-cost airlines in mind. Though terminals may have differing charges and costs, as is common in Europe, the concept of an all-budget terminal was promoted and pioneered by Tony Fernandes of AirAsia at Kuala Lumpur International Airport in 2006.

Description

In some cases, the designs of a low-cost carrier terminal mimic old designs of an airport terminal, such as the former airport of Hong Kong, Kai Tak Airport. With a stripped-down airport terminal, airports can reduce daily operating costs significantly, thereby passing along the savings to budget airlines and ultimately their passengers. It specifically entails cost reductions from normal airports in terms of:

 Physical building: 
 forgoing expensive architectural design for simple boxy warehouse-like design.
 low ceilings.
 foregoing steel and glass structures to reduce air conditioning overhead cost.
 Amenities:
 may have less choice in terms of restaurants and duty-free shops.
 decoration may be mostly airline ads.
 Support structures:
 long corridors, moving walkways, and jet bridges often replaced by transport with airport buses and boarding with airstairs.  (This also allows quicker plane turnaround time, which may lower landing fees, and increase aircraft utilization).
  Baggage handling is much simplified, e.g. some LCCTs lack baggage carousels.

However these terminals may also have modern facilities such as free Wi-Fi, and be comfortably air conditioned. A German study (Swanson 2007) of costs showed that at Malaysia's KLIA and Changi LCCTs, airlines were charged roughly 2/3 to 3/4 the total cost of landing at the main terminal; for budget-sensitive carriers, any savings advantage can be critical.

Klia2 billed as the world's largest purpose-built terminal dedicated to low-cost carriers, is designed to cater for 45 million passengers a year with future capacity expansion capability. Built at a cost of US$1.3 billion, klia2 started commercial operations on May 2, 2014, at the Kuala Lumpur International Airport in Malaysia.

Realisation of the projects
While the concept of a simple basic terminal in theory would lower costs, in practice, it can be turned into a pork barrel project such as klia2.

Budget terminals also have to consider if they only serve budget airlines or all airlines. In this way, a terminal can essentially "lose its budget identity". In the case of Macau airport, "from an airport perspective, having a separate LCCT is frequently more expensive than having one terminal for all carrier types because of the need to duplicate services and systems including check-in, security and immigration."  In the case of KLIA2, Malaysia Airports has instructed Airasia in 2016 that the overbudget terminal isn't a LCCT terminal at all.

List of existing/expanding budget terminals

Europe 
 Kukës International Airport - Airport dedicated to low-cost carriers.
 Brussels South Charleroi Airport - Their flights are mainly from low-cost carriers.
 Lyon-Saint Exupéry Airport - The creation of Terminal 3, a former charter facility for low-cost airlines.
 Marseille Provence Airport - First terminal entirely developed for low-cost airlines in France.
 Toulouse–Blagnac Airport - The new Hall A dedicated for low-cost and regional airlines.
 David the Builder Kutaisi International Airport - Airport served mainly by low-cost carriers.
 Berlin Schönefeld Airport - Some non-budget carriers operate here but it brings the concept of a budget terminal.
 Cologne Bonn Airport - It is served mainly by Ryanair and Eurowings, the larger Düsseldorf Airport is the main airport of Rhine-Ruhr.
 Frankfurt–Hahn Airport - The only airlines that operate commercial passenger service to/from the airport of which are low-cost carriers.
 Budapest International Airport - Not a dedicated low-cost terminal though Terminal 2 is cheaper to use than Terminal 1.
 Dublin Airport - It serves as the headquarters of Ireland's flag carrier – Aer Lingus, Europe's largest low-cost carrier – Ryanair, and ASL Airlines Ireland, together with another airline, CityJet.
 Milan Malpensa Airport - Terminal 2 is exclusively dedicated to low-cost carriers (mostly EasyJet).
 Rome Fiumicino Airport - Terminal 2 is exclusively dedicated to low-cost carriers.
 Riga International Airport - Largest airport in the Baltic states with direct flights, and as one of the base airports of low-cost airlines.
 Amsterdam Airport Schiphol - Base and operation for low-cost airliners.
 Warsaw Modlin Airport - Airport dedicated to low-cost carriers.
 Aurel Vlaicu International Airport - Bucharest's low-cost hub.
 Barcelona–El Prat Josep Tarradellas Airport - It is a hub for Level and Vueling, and a focus city for Air Europa, Iberia, EasyJet, Norwegian and Ryanair.
 Stockholm Skavsta Airport  - A former military airport, now an airport dedicated to low-cost carriers.
 Gatwick Airport - The world's leading low-cost airport.
 Stansted Airport - Stansted is a base for a number of major European low-cost carriers, being the largest base for low-cost airline Ryanair.
 Luton Airport - The airport serves as a base for EasyJet, TUI Airways, Ryanair and Wizz Air. 
 Kyiv Boryspil Airport - Opened in March 2019, Terminal F, a former cargo terminal as the terminal for low-cost carriers.

Asia & Oceania 
 Melbourne Airport - the first budget terminal in Australia, Terminal 4 is currently used by Jetstar.
 Indira Gandhi International Airport - Terminal 1 not dedicated to but being used by low-cost carriers
 Soekarno-Hatta Airport Terminal 1C & 2F - Terminal 1C is domestic LCCT when 2F is the international LCCT. created by elimination of existing air conditioning, duty-free shops, baggage handling and air bridges, reducing # of check-in desks, while adding kiosks, self-service bag drop, and expanding the capacity from 9 to 24 million.
 Ben Gurion International Airport - Terminal 1, the older terminal (replaced by Terminal 3) renovated and dedicated for low-cost international flights, opened at June 2017
 Naha International Airport - small budget terminal opened Oct 2012.
 Narita International Airport Terminal 3 opened April 8, 2015 with discounted airport tax.
 Kansai International Airport - small budget terminal opened Oct 2012.
 Kuala Lumpur International Airport - klia2,  Opened in May 2014 and it is a hybrid terminal that accommodates low-cost carriers.
 Kota Kinabalu International Airport - Not a true LCCT terminal as non-budget carriers use this terminal, but incorporates the concept.
 Don Mueang International Airport - Former main airport of Bangkok before being replaced by Suvarnabhumi International Airport.

North & South America 
 El Palomar Airport - Military airport, now shares the airport with low-cost carriers.
 São Paulo–Congonhas Airport - Created as a cargo terminal, Terminal 1 nowadays is used by 2 Brazilian LCCT without jetbridges and a simple departure lounge with 9 gates
 Guaymaral Airport - Military airport, now shares the airport with low-cost carriers.
 Olaya Herrera Airport - Past Medellín’s main airport terminal, now a low-cost terminal and second most busiest airport in Medellín.
 Panamá Pacífico International Airport - Ex military airport located in the old Howard Air Force Base, now transformed for low-cost airlines to operate.
 Austin-Bergstrom International Airport - the South Terminal hosts Austin's ULCCs.

List of proposed budget terminals
  Taoyuan International Airport
  Clark International Airport, the first in the country, despite having low-cost carriers for decades.
  Ramenskoye Airport
  Bangkok is also urged by airlines to consider such a terminal
  Chubu (Nagoya) was considering it in 2013.
  Brisbane is considering a LCCT under its master plan.
  Transportation Secretary of Philippines unveiled a plan for a LCCT at NAIA.
  is actively looking into LCCTs as well as low cost carriers.

References

External links
 
 
 
 

Airport infrastructure